Uromyces musae is a plant pathogen infecting bananas.

References

External links
 Index Fungorum
 USDA ARS Fungal Database

Fungal plant pathogens and diseases
Banana diseases
musae
Fungi described in 1907